Mohamed Azwan bin Ali (Jawi: محمد ازوان بن علي; born 13 February 1966), also known by his nickname as Diva AA, is a Malaysian television host and actor.

Personal life
He grew up in Kampung Gate Baru, Setapak, Kuala Lumpur and obtained a Bachelor of Law degree from the Universiti Malaya in 1989. His father, Ali and his mother, Che Tom Yahaya settled in the village of Klang Gate, Taman Melawati, Ulu Kelang, Selangor. His siblings include his brother, the current Bukit Antarabangsa Assemblyman, Azmin Ali and his younger sister, Ummi Hafilda Ali.

Politics involvement
In the 2018 general election, Azwan contested the Selangor State Legislative Assembly seat of Bukit Antarabangsa as an independent using the elephant logo, but had lost to his elder brother, Azmin Ali who was the incumbent constituency assemblymen and Selangor Menteri Besar then.

Controversies 
He has been known to commit several controversial incidents through both his social media and mass media causing troubles against him.

Election results

References

External links

1966 births
Living people
Malaysian people of Malay descent
Malaysian Muslims
People from Kuala Lumpur
Malaysian television personalities
Malaysian male actors
Independent politicians in Malaysia
Malaysian actor-politicians
University of Malaya alumni
21st-century Malaysian people